This is a list of youngest fathers on record, all aged 14 years and under at the time of the child's birth.

List

9 years old

10 years old

11 years old

12 years old

13 years old

14 years old

See also
List of youngest birth mothers
Child sexual abuse
Precocious puberty
"The Trees They Grow So High"

References

Child sexual abuse
Adolescent sexuality
Lists of people by age
Lists of men
Fathers
Fatherhood
Precocious puberty and pregnancy
Biological records
Parenting-related lists